New Jersey held its election October 10–11, 1814. The state returned to an at-large basis for electing its representatives, abolishing the short-lived districts of the previous election.

See also 
 New Jersey's 3rd congressional district special election, 1814
 United States House of Representatives elections, 1814 and 1815
 List of United States representatives from New Jersey

1814
New Jersey
United States House of Representatives